Albert Edward Barker (16 September 1901 – 20 December 1961) was an Australian rules footballer who played for the Footscray Football Club in the Victorian Football League (VFL).

Notes

External links 
		

1901 births
1961 deaths
Australian rules footballers from Victoria (Australia)
Western Bulldogs players